Tianjin, alternately romanized as Tientsin, is a municipality and a coastal metropolis in Northern China on the shore of the Bohai Sea. It is one of the nine national central cities in Mainland China, with a total population of 13,866,009 inhabitants during the 2020 Chinese census. Its built-up (or metro) area, made up of 12 central districts (all but Baodi, Jizhou, Jinghai and Ninghe), was home to 11,165,706 inhabitants and is also the world's 29th-largest agglomeration (between Chengdu and Rio de Janeiro) and 11th-most populous city proper.

It is governed as one of the four municipalities under the direct administration of Chinese central government and is thus under direct administration of the State Council.  Tianjin borders Hebei Province and Beijing Municipality, bounded to the east by the Bohai Gulf portion of the Yellow Sea. Part of the Bohai Economic Rim, it is the largest coastal city in Northern China and part of the Jing-Jin-Ji megapolis.

In terms of urban population, Tianjin is the seventh largest city in China. In terms of administrative area population, Tianjin ranks fifth in Mainland China. The walled city of Tianjin was built in 1404. As a treaty port since 1860, Tianjin has been a major seaport and gateway to Beijing. During the Boxer Rebellion the city was the seat of the Tianjin Provisional Government. Under the Qing dynasty and the Republic of China, Tianjin became one of the largest cities in the region. At that time, numerous European-style buildings and mansions were constructed in concessions, many of which are well-preserved today. After the founding of the People's Republic of China, Tianjin suffered a depression due to the policy of the central government and 1976 Tangshan earthquake, but recovered from 1990s. Tianjin is classified as the largest type of port-city, a Large-Port Megacity, due to its large urban population and port traffic volume.

Nowadays, Tianjin is a dual-core city, with its main urban area (including the old city) located along the Hai River, which connects to the Yellow and Yangtze Rivers via the Grand Canal; and Binhai, an adjacent New Area urban core located east of the old city, on the coast of the Bohai Gulf. As of the end of 2010, around 285 Fortune 500 companies have set up base in Binhai. Since 2010, Tianjin's Yujiapu Financial District has become known as China's Manhattan and the city is considered one of the world's top 100 cities, including in the Global Financial Centres Index. Tianjin is ranked as a Beta (global second tier) city by the Globalization and World Cities Research Network.

Tianjin is one of the top 20 cities in the world by scientific research outputs as tracked by the Nature Index, and home to multiple notable institutes of higher education in Northern China, including Tianjin University, Nankai University, Tianjin Normal University, Tianjin Medical University, Tiangong University, Tianjin University of Science & Technology, Tianjin University of Technology, and Hebei University of Technology.

Name
Tianjin is the pinyin romanization of the Chinese characters , which means "Heavenly Ford" or "Ford of Heaven".

The origin of the name is obscure. One folk etymology is that it was an homage to the patriotic Chu poet Qu Yuan, whose "Li Sao" includes the verse "... departing from the Ford of Heaven at dawn ..." (zhāo fārèn yú Tiānjīn xī). Another is that it honors a former name of the Girl, a Chinese constellation recorded under the name Tianjin in the Astronomical Record section of the Book of Sui. A third is that it derives from a place name noted in the River Record of the History of Jin. The most common is that it was bestowed by the Yongle Emperor of the Ming, who crossed Tianjin's Gu River on his way south to overthrow his nephew, the Jianwen Emperor.

Prior to the introduction of pinyin, the city's name was historically romanized as Tientsin in the Chinese postal romanization. The current English spelling of Tianjin was adopted in 1958 after pinyin was introduced by the PRC government. Several countries, international organizations and media outlets adopted the pinyin name beginning in 1979. The Government of the Republic of China on Taiwan continues to use the postal and Wade-Giles spelling after the adoption of pinyin by the ROC government in 2009.

History

Early history 
The land where Tianjin is located today was created in between 900 and 1300 CE by sedimentation of various rivers entering the sea at Bohai Gulf, including the Yellow River, which entered the open sea in this area at one point. The construction of the Grand Canal under the Sui dynasty helped the future development of Tianjin as the canal ran from Hangzhou to the Beijing and Tianjin region by 609 CE. Grain from southern China was regularly transported to the north through the canal and was used during the subsequent dynasties. Tianjin begins to be increasingly mentioned in records during the Song dynasty and gains importance during the Yuan dynasty. Tianjin experienced development under the Yuan and became a prime location for the storage of goods and grains. Tianjin became a garrison town and shipping station during the Ming dynasty. It became a center of commerce and prosperity by the 17th century.

Qing dynasty

During the Qing dynasty (16441911) Tianjin Prefecture or Zhou was established in 1725, and Tianjin County was established within the prefecture in 1731. Later it was upgraded to an urban prefecture or Fu before becoming a relay station under the command of the Viceroy of Zhili.

Opening up as a treaty port

In 1856, Chinese soldiers boarded The Arrow, a Chinese-owned ship registered in Hong Kong flying the British flag and suspected of piracy, smuggling, and of being engaged in the opium trade. They captured 12 men and imprisoned them. In response, the British and French sent gunboats under the command of Admiral Sir Michael Seymour to capture the Taku forts near Tianjin in May 1858. At the end of the first part of the Second Opium War in June of the same year, the British and French prevailed, and the Treaty of Tientsin were signed, which opened Tianjin (Tientsin) to foreign trade. The treaties were ratified by the Xianfeng Emperor in 1860, and Tianjin was formally opened to Great Britain and France, and thus to the outside world. Between 1895 and 1900, Britain and France were joined by Japan, Germany and Russia, and even by countries without Chinese concessions such as Austria-Hungary, Italy and Belgium, in establishing self-contained concessions in Tianjin, each with its own prisons, schools, barracks and hospitals. These nations left many architectural reminders of their rule, notably churches and thousands of villas.

The presence of foreign influence in Tianjin was not always peaceful; one of the most serious violent incidents to date was the Tianjin Church Massacre. In June 1870, the orphanage held by the Wanghailou Church (Church Our Lady's Victories), in Tianjin, built by French Roman Catholic missionaries, was accused of the kidnapping and brainwashing of Chinese children. On June 21, the magistrate of Tianjin County initiated a showdown at the church that developed into violent clashes between the church's Christian supporters and some non-Christian Tianjin residents. The furious protesters eventually burned down Wanghailou Church and the nearby French consulate and killed eighteen foreigners including ten French nuns, the French consul himself, and merchants. France and six other Western nations complained to the Qing government, which was forced to pay compensation for the incident.

In 1885 Li Hongzhang founded the Tianjin Military Academy for Chinese army officers with German advisors, as part of his military reforms. The move was supported by Anhui Army commander Zhou Shengchuan. The academy was to serve Anhui Army and Green Standard Army officers. Various practical military, mathematic and science subjects were taught at the academy. The instructors were German officers. Another program was started at the academy for five years in 1887 to train teenagers as new army officers. Mathematics, practical and technical subjects including sciences, foreign languages, Chinese Classics and history were taught at the school. Exams were administered to students. The instruction for Tianjin Military Academy was copied at the Weihaiwei and Shanhaiguan military schools. The 'maritime defense fund' supplied the budget for the Tianjin Military Academy, which was shared with the Tianjin Naval Academy. The Tianjin Military Academy in 1886 adopted as part of its curriculum the Romance of the Three Kingdoms. Among its alumni were Wang Yingkai and Duan Qirui. Among its staff was Yinchang.

In June 1900, the Boxers were able to seize control of much of Tianjin. On June 26, European defense forces heading towards Beijing were stopped by Boxers at nearby Langfang, and were defeated and forced to turn back to Tianjin. The foreign concessions were also under siege for several weeks.

In July 1900, the Eight-Nation Alliance recaptured Tianjin. This alliance soon established the Tianjin Provisional Government, composed of representatives from each of the occupying forces (Russian, British, Japanese, German, French, American, Austro-Hungarian, and Italian). The city was governed by this council until August 15, 1902 when the city was returned to Qing control. Eminent Qing General Yuan Shikai led efforts to transform Tianjin into a modern city, establishing the first modern Chinese police force. In 1907, Yuan supervised China's first modern democratic elections for a county council.

Western nations were permitted to garrison the area to ensure open access to Beijing. The British maintained a brigade of two battalions in Tianjin, and the Italians, French, Japanese, Germans, Russians, and Austro-Hungarians maintained under strength regiments; the United States did not initially participate. During World War I, the German and Austro-Hungarian garrisons were captured and held as Prisoners of War by Allied Forces while the Bolshevik government withdrew the Russian garrison in 1918. In 1920, the remaining participating nations asked the United States to join them, and the US then sent the 15th Infantry Regiment, less one battalion, to Tianjin from the Philippines.

Because of the rapid development of industry, commerce and finance, Tianjin was established as a municipality of China in 1927. From 1930 to 1935, Tianjin was the provincial capital of Hebei, after which it was reestablished as an independent municipality.

Garrison duty was highly regarded by the troops. General George C. Marshall, the "architect of victory" in World War II when he was the United States Army Chief of Staff, served at Tianjin in the 1920s as Executive Officer of the 15th Infantry. The US withdrew this unit in 1938 and a US presence was maintained only by the dispatch of a small US Marine Corps unit from the Embassy Guard at Beijing.

Second Sino-Japanese War
On July 30, 1937, Tianjin fell to Japan, as part of the Second Sino-Japanese War, but was not entirely occupied, as the Japanese for the most part respected foreign concessions until 1941, when the American and British concessions were occupied. In the summer of 1939, there occurred a major crisis in Anglo-Japanese relations with the Tientsin Incident. On June 14, 1939, the Imperial Japanese Army surrounded and blockaded the British concession over the refusal of the British authorities to hand over to the Japanese six Chinese who had assassinated a locally prominent Japanese collaborator, and had taken refuge in the British concession. For a time, the 1939 crisis appeared likely to cause an Anglo-Japanese war, especially when reports of the maltreatment by the Japanese Army of British subjects wishing to leave or enter the concession appeared in the British press. The crisis ended when the British Prime Minister Neville Chamberlain was advised by the Royal Navy and the Foreign Office that the only way to force the Japanese to lift the blockade was to send the main British battle fleet to Far Eastern waters, and that given the current crisis in Europe it would be inappropriate to send the British fleet out of European waters, thus leading the British to finally turn over the six Chinese, who were then executed by the Japanese. During the Japanese occupation, Tianjin was ruled by the North China Executive Committee, a puppet state based in Beijing.

On August 9, 1940, all of the British troops in Tianjin were ordered to withdraw. On November 14, 1941 the American Marine unit stationed in Tianjin was ordered to leave, but before this could be accomplished, the Japanese attacked the United States. The American Marine detachment surrendered to the Japanese on December 8, 1941. Only the Italian and French concessions (the local French officials were loyal to Vichy) were allowed by the Japanese to remain. When Italy signed an armistice with the Allies in September 1943, Japanese troops took the Italian concession following a battle with its garrison, and the Italian Social Republic formally ceded it to Wang Jingwei's Japan-controlled puppet state. Japanese occupation of the city lasted until August 15, 1945, with the surrender of Japan marking the end of World War II.

Post World War II

In the Pingjin Campaign of the Chinese Civil War, the city was captured after 29 hours of fighting.  The Chinese Communist Party (CCP) took Tianjin on January 15, 1949.

From 1949 to February 1958, Tianjin was a municipality directly under the control of the central government. In October 1952, Tanggu New Port officially opened its doors, and the first 10,000-ton ferry arrived at Newport Pier. In February 1958, due to the "Great Leap Forward" and Tianjin's good industrial foundation, Tianjin was incorporated into Hebei Province and Hebei Province was relocated to Tianjin for eight years. During the period, under the coordination of the State Council, the city of Tianjin implemented a separate policy for central planning, which was independent of Hebei Province. However, a large number of factories and colleges in Tianjin moved to Hebei, adversely affecting Tianjin's economic development. In January 1967, due to "preparation, preparation for disasters", and concerns that Tianjin would become a battlefield, Hebei Province repatriated the provincial capital to Baoding, and the CCP Central Committee decided that Tianjin should be restored to the central municipality and remain so far. In April 1970, in the event that the Central Government had applied for funding for the construction of the subway, the Tianjin Municipal Government decided to raise funds on its own to establish the project on the basis of the name of the channel, and build it on the basis of the old walled river. In July 1973, five counties including Jixian, Baodi, Wuqing, Jinghai, and Ninghe were formally placed under the jurisdiction of Tianjin.

On July 28, 1976, during the 7.6 magnitude Tangshan Earthquake, Tianjin was affected by the shock waves and suffered major loss of life. In the city, 24,345 people died and 21,497 were seriously injured. 60% of the city's buildings were destroyed and more than 30% of the enterprises and Peking Port Reservoir and Yuqiao Reservoir were seriously damaged. Nearly 700,000 people were left homeless. On October 10 of the same year, the Tianjin Underground Railway was opened to traffic. In 1981, Miyun Reservoir was built on the upper reaches of the Hai River and is used to supply water for Beijing, however the reservoir stopped the river from supplying water to Tianjin, resulting in difficulty in the use of water in Tianjin. In the same year, the State Council of the People's Republic of China decided to initiate a project to solve the problem of water use in Tianjin and attract talented individuals to the city's academic centers.

In 1984, during the beginning of the Chinese government's economic reforms, Tianjin was listed as one of the 14 coastal open cities by the State Council and the Tianjin Development Zone's economy began to develop rapidly, However, the overall development speed of Tianjin is still slower than that of special economic zones and that of other southeast coastal areas. In 1994, Tianjin began its strategic industrial shift towards the east and developed the Binhai New Area with the Tianjin Port as the core. In October 2005, the Fifth Plenary Session of the 16th CCP Central Committee was convened. The meeting decided to incorporate the development and opening up of the Binhai New Area into the "Eleventh Five-Year Plan" and the national development strategy. In March 2006, the State Council executive meeting positioned Tianjin as an "international port city, a northern economic center, and an "ecological city". Since then, the dispute between the Beijing-Tianjin economic center at the policy level has come to an end. In May 2006, the State Council approved the Binhai New Area as a national integrated reform pilot area. In June of the same year, the "State Council's Opinions on Promoting the Development and Opening of the Tianjin Binhai New Area" was announced and clearly stated: "In financial enterprises, financial services, financial markets, and finance Major reforms such as opening up can, in principle, be scheduled to precede the Tianjin Binhai New Area.

In August 2008, China's first high-speed railway, the Beijing-Tianjin Intercity Railway, with a speed of 350 kilometers per hour was opened. In August 2008 Tianjin was the co-host city of the 29th Olympic Games. In September 2008, the Annual Meeting of the New Champions of World Economic Forum (also called Summer Davos) began to be established in Tianjin and is held every two years. In October 2010, the UN Climate Change Conference convened in Tianjin. In 2012, the Tianjin Metro Lines 2, 3, and 9 were completed and open to traffic, and Tianjin Rail Transit was formally networked.

In October 2013, Tianjin hosted the East Asian Games, which was the first time Tianjin hosted an international comprehensive event. In 2014, the coordinated development of Beijing, Tianjin, and Hebei was officially incorporated into the national strategy. Tianjin was positioned as "National Advanced Manufacturing R&D Base, Northern International Shipping Core Area, Financial Innovation Operation Demonstration Area, and Reform and Opening-up Preceding Area". In the same year, the first phase of the South-to-North Water Transfer Project was completed, and the water availability in Tianjin improved. On February 26, 2015, the Tianjin National Independent Innovation Demonstration Zone was formally established. On April 21, the China (Tianjin) Free Trade Pilot Zone was formally established. On April 27, Jincheng Bank, the first private bank in northern China, officially opened its doors.

2015 Tianjin explosion
On August 12, 2015, a major fire and explosion accident occurred in a chemical warehouse in Tianjin Port, causing 173 deaths, hundreds of injuries, and property losses. The first two explosions occurred within 30 seconds of each other at the facility, which is located in the Binhai New Area of Tianjin, China. The second explosion was far larger and involved the detonation of about 800 tonnes of ammonium nitrate (approx. 256 tonnes TNT equivalent). Fires caused by the initial explosions continued to burn uncontrolled throughout the weekend, resulting in eight additional explosions on 15 August. The buildings of seven more surrounding logistics companies were destroyed. The cost to businesses caused by the explosion was estimated at $9 billion, making it the third most expensive supply chain disruption of 2015.

Geography

Tianjin is located along the west coast of the Bohai Gulf, looking out to the provinces Shandong and Liaoning across those waters, bordered by Beijing  to the northwest, and is surrounded on all sides by Hebei, with the exception of its eastern border,  the Bohai Sea. It lies at the northern end of the Grand Canal of China, which connects with the Yellow River and Yangtze River. The municipality is generally flat, and swampy near the coast, but hilly in the far north, where the Yan Mountains intrude into northern Tianjin. Extensive tidal flats occur on the coastal plain adjacent to the city.

The Hai River forms within Tianjin Municipality at the confluence of the Ziya River, Daqing River, Yongding River, North Grand Canal, and South Grand Canal, and enters the Pacific Ocean within the municipality, as well in Tanggu District. Major reservoirs include the Beidagang Reservoir in the extreme south (in Dagang District) and the Yuqiao Reservoir in the extreme north in Ji County.

Climate
Tianjin has a semi-arid climate (Köppen BSk bordering on Dwa). It has a four-season, monsoon-influenced climate, typical of East Asia, with cold, windy, very dry winters reflecting the influence of the vast Siberian anticyclone, and hot, humid summers, due to the monsoon. Spring in the city is dry and windy, occasionally seeing sandstorms blowing in from the Gobi Desert, capable of lasting for several days. With monthly percent possible sunshine ranging from 48% in July to 61% in October, the city receives 2,522 hours of bright sunshine annually.

Measures to improve air quality
In May 2014, the city's administration enacted new laws in an attempt to lower the city's pollution levels. These measures included several restrictions on days of severe pollution; halving the number of vehicles allowed on roads, halting construction and manufacturing activity, closing schools, and halting large-scale outdoor activities.
 Flights have also been grounded and highways closed.

Foreign-born professional sportsmen have made statements regarding Tianjin's air quality, citing it as an impediment to athletic activity and being thick enough to "taste".

Administrative divisions

Tianjin is divided into 16 county-level divisions, which are all districts.

In addition, the Tianjin Economic and Technological Development Area (TEDA) is not a formal level of administration, but nevertheless enjoys rights similar to a regular district. At the end of 2017, the total population of Tianjin is 15.57 million.

These districts and counties are further subdivided, into 240 township-level divisions, including 120 towns, 18 townships, 2 ethnic townships and 100 subdistricts.

Politics

The politics of Tianjin is structured in a dual party-government system like all other governing institutions in the mainland China.

The Mayor of Tianjin is the highest-ranking official in the People's Government of Tianjin. Since Tianjin is a municipality, the CCP Municipal Committee Secretary is colloquially termed the "Tianjin CCP Party chief".

Economy 

Tianjin's GDP reached 1.572 trillion yuan in 2014, an increase of 10.0 percent over 2013. The city of Tianjin recorded China's highest per-capita GDP with $17,126, followed by Beijing with $16,278 and Shanghai with $15,847.

Major industries include petrochemical industries, textiles, car manufacturing, mechanical industries, and metalworking. EADS Airbus is an important manufacturer, and has opened an assembly plant for its Airbus A320 series airliners, operational since 2009. Tianjin also hit the news in 2010, as the current fastest supercomputer in the world, Tianhe-1A, is located at the National Supercomputing Center of Tianjin. GDP in 2009 hit ￥750.1 billion, with a per capita of RMB￥62,403.

Tianjin Economic-Technological Development Area 

As one of the first state-level economic and technological development zones, the Tianjin Economic-Technological Development Area (TEDA) was founded on December 6, 1984, with the approval of the State Council. It enjoys relevant state preferential policies with the major task of attracting domestic and foreign investment to develop high and new technology oriented modern industries. As an affiliated organ of the Tianjin Municipal Government, the Administrative Commission of Tianjin Economic-Technological Development Area exercises unified administration of TEDA on behalf of the Tianjin Municipal Government and enjoys provincial-level administrative and economic management rights.

Tianjin Export Processing Zone 
The Tianjin Export Processing Zone is one of the first 15 export processing zones approved by the State Council on April 27, 2000. This is a special enclosed zone where the Customs conduct 24-hour administration on commodities transported into and out of the zone and relevant places. The central government granted this special economic zone special preferential policies to attract enterprises in the business of processing and trade to invest in the zone. The area developed in the first phase is 1m². A permanent wall is built to separate export processing zone and non-export processing zone.

Tianjin Airport Economic Area 
The Tianjin Airport International Logistics Zone is jointly invested by Tianjin Port Free Trade Zone and Tianjin Binhai International Airport. It is located inside the airfreight area of Tianjin Binhai International Airport. It has domestic and foreign excellent airfreight logistics enterprises engaged in sorting, warehousing, distribution, processing, exhibition. It is in the process of constructing the largest airfreight base in northern China.

Tianjin Port Free Trade Zone 

The Tianjin Port Free Trade Zone is the only free trade zone in northern China. The zone was approved to be established in 1991 by State Council.

Tianjin Tanggu National Marine High-Tech Development Area 
The Tianjin Tanggu Marine High-Tech Development Area was established in 1992, and was upgraded to the national-level high-tech development area by the State Council in 1995, it is the only national-level high-tech development area specializing in developing the marine Hi-Tech industry. By the end of 2008, the zone had 2068 corporations and 5 industries there including new materials, oil manufacturing, modern machinery manufacturing, and electronic information.

Tianjin Nangang Industrial Zone 
The Tianjin Nangang Industrial Zone is a heavy and chemical industry base and harbor; an important part of the "dual-city, dual-harbor"space development strategy of Tianjin, a demonstration zone of circular economy.

Agriculture 
Farmland takes up about 40% of Tianjin Municipality's total area. Wheat, rice, and maize are the most important crops.

Resources 
 Geothermal energy is another resource of Tianjin. Deposits of manganese and boron under Tianjin were the first to be found in China.

Utilities and Services 

Tianjin Electric Power Utility serves with construction, delivering and supporting electrical power service.

Binhai New Area 
The Tianjin Binhai New Area (TBNA) is located in the juncture of the Beijing-Tianjin City Belt and the Circum-Bohai City Belt. It is the gateway to North China, Northeast China, and Northwest China. Lying in the center of Northeast Asia, it is the nearest point of departure of the Eurasian Continental Bridge.

Demographics

At the end of 2009, the population of Tianjin Municipality was 12.28 million, of which 9.8 million were residential holders of Tianjin hukou (permanent residence). Among Tianjin permanent residents, 5.99 million were urban, and 3.81 million were rural.  Tianjin has recently shifted to rapid population growth, its population had reached 14.72 million  end.

The encompassing metropolitan area was estimated by the OECD (Organization for Economic Cooperation and Development) to have, a population of 15.4 million.

The majority of Tianjin residents are Han Chinese. There are also 51 out of the 55 minor Chinese ethnic groups living in Tianjin. Major minorities include Hui, Koreans, Manchus, and Mongols.

This excludes members of the People's Liberation Army in active service.

Media
Tianjin People's Broadcasting Station is the major radio station in Tianjin. Broadcasting in nine channels, it serves most of North China, part of East and Northeast China, reaching an audience of over 100 million. Tianjin Television, the local television station, broadcasts on nine channels. It also boasts a paid digital channel, featuring home improvement programs. Both the radio and television stations are now branches of the Tianjin Film, Radio and Television Group, established in October 2002.

Major local newspapers include the Tianjin Daily and Jin Wan Bao (literally, tonight newspaper), which are the flagship papers of Tianjin Daily Newspaper Group and Jinwan Mass Media Group, respectively. There are also three English-language magazines: Jin, Tianjin Plus and Business Tianjin, mostly directed at ex-pats resident in the city.

Previous newspapers
The first German newspaper in northern China, Tageblatt für Nordchina, was published in Tianjin.

In 1912 Tianjin had 17 Chinese-language newspapers and 5 daily newspapers in other languages; none of the newspapers in the Tianjin district were trade papers. Of the foreign language newspapers, three were in English and one each was in French and German. Newspapers from Tianjin published in Tianjin included China Critic, Peking and Tientsin Times, The China Times,
Tageblatt für Nordchina, L'Écho de Tientsin, China Tribune, Ta Kung Pao (L'Impartial), Min Hsing Pao, and Jih Jih Shin Wen Pao (Tsientsin Daily News). Newspapers from Beijing published in Tianjin included Pei Ching Jih Pao, Peking Daily News, and Le Journal de Peking.

In 1930, the newspaper Deutsch-Mandschurische Nachrichten moved from Harbin to Tianjin and changed its name to the Deutsch-Chinesische Nachrichten.

Censorship capital
More and more, China's leading Internet information providers (usually located in Beijing), including social network Sina Weibo, Douban and the online video website Sohu, tend to relocate their censorship departments to Tianjin, where labor costs are cheaper than Beijing, as censorship is a kind of labor-intensive work. In fact, Tianjin has become the censorship capital of Chinese Internet.

Tourism

The city has many sights; its streetscapes incorporate historic nineteenth and early twentieth-century European architecture, juxtaposed with the concrete and glass monoliths of contemporary China. Though wide swaths of the city are being redeveloped, much of the colonial architecture has been placed under protection.

In the nineteenth century, the port city caught the attention of the seafaring Western powers, who used the boarding of a British ship by Chinese troops as an excuse to declare war. With well-armed gunboats, they were assured of victory, and the Treaty of Tianjin, signed in 1856, gave the Europeans the right to establish nine concessionary bases on the mainland, from which they could conduct trade and sell opium. These concessions, along the banks of the Hai River, were self-contained European communities: the French built châteaux and towers, while the Germans constructed red-tiled Bavarian villas. Tensions between the indigenous population and the foreigners exploded in the Tianjin Incident of 1870, when a Chinese mob attacked a French-run orphanage, and again during the Boxer Rebellion in 1900, after which the foreigners leveled the walls surrounding the old Chinese city to enable them to keep an eye on its residents.

The old city was razed entirely from 2000 to 2001 to make way for new developments. Only several old buildings remains such as the Tianjin Temple of Confucius.

The dense network of ex-concession streets south and west of the central train station, and south of the Hai River, now constitute the areas of most interest to visitors. The châteaux of the French concession now make up the downtown district just south of the river, the imposing mansions the British built are east of here. Farther east, also south of the river, the architecture of an otherwise unremarkable district has a sprinkling of austere German construction.

Landmarks and attractions

 Astor Hotel
 Binjiang Avenue shopping street
 Drum Tower
 Five Main Avenues
 Former Concessions in Tianjin
 Tianjin Italian Style Town
 Goldin Finance 117
 Hai River Park
 Luzutang Boxer Rebellion Museum
 Memorial Hall to Zhou Enlai and Deng Yingchao
 Nanshi Cuisine Street
 People's Park
 St. Joseph's Cathedral of Tianjin
 Temple of Confucius Wen Miao
 Temple of Great Compassion
 Century Clock
 Tianjin Ancient Culture Street
 Yuhuangge Taoist Temple
 Tianjin Eye
 Tianjin Museum
 Tianjin Binhai Library
 Tianjin Art Gallery
 Tianjin Natural History Museum
 Tianjin Olympic Center Stadium, also known as "The Water Drop"
 Tianjin Radio and Television Tower
 Tianjin Water Park
 Tianjin World Financial Center
 Tianjin Zoo
 Yangliuqing (including Shi Family Grand Courtyard)
 Porcelain House
 Nankai University
 Nankai Middle School
 Tianjin University

Sights outside the old city urban core area, but within the municipality, including Binhai/TEDA:
 Huangya Pass, a section of the Great Wall of China
 Mount Panshan
 Sino-Singapore Tianjin Eco-city
 Soviet Aircraft Carrier Kiev
 Taku Forts
 TEDA Football Stadium, home stadium of Chinese Super League team Tianjin Teda F.C.

Culture

People from Tianjin speak the Tianjin dialect of Mandarin, from which it is derived. Despite its proximity to Beijing, the Tianjin dialect sounds quite different from the Beijing dialect, which provides the basis for Putonghua or Standard Chinese.

Tianjin is a respected home base of Beijing opera, one of the most prestigious forms of Chinese opera.

Tianjin is famous for its stand-up comedy and comedians including Guo Degang and Ma Sanli. Ma Sanli (1914–2003), an ethnic Hui and longtime resident of Tianjin, is renowned for his xiangsheng, a hugely popular form of Chinese entertainment akin to comedy. Ma Sanli delivered some of his xiangsheng in the Tianjin dialect. Tianjin, along with Beijing, is a center for the art of xiangsheng. Tianjin's style of stand-up also includes the use of rhythmic bamboo clappers, kuaiban.

Tianjin is also famous for the Zhang clay figurine, a type of intricate, colorful figurine depicting a variety of vivid characters, and Tianjin's Wei's kites, which can be folded to a fraction of their full sizes and are noted for portability.

On September 28, 2015, the Juilliard School in Manhattan, New York City announced a major expansion into Tianjin during a visit by China's first lady, Peng Liyuan, the institution's first such full-scale foray outside the United States, with plans to offer a master's degree program.

Cuisine
Tianjin cuisine places a heavy focus on seafood, due to Tianjin's proximity to the sea.  It can be further classified into several varieties, including the rough, smooth, and high. Prominent menus include the Eight Great Bowls, a combination of eight mainly meat dishes, and the Four Great Stews, actually referring to a very large number of stews, including chicken, duck, seafood, beef, and mutton.

The four delicacies of Tianjin include Goubuli baozi, Guifaxiang Shibajie Mahua, Erduoyan Zhagao and Maobuwen Jiaozi. Well-known foods include Caoji donkey meat, Bazhen sheep-leg mutton of Guanshengyuan, Luji Tangmian Zhagao, Baiji Shuijiao, Gaogan of Zhilanzhai, Guobacai of Dafulai, Subao of Shitoumenkan and Xiaobao chestnut. These famous snacks are available in Nanshi Food Street, which was a famous calling-card of Tianjin in the aspect of cuisine.

Transport

Airport

The city is also served by the new Beijing Daxing International Airport in Beijing.

It has a grade 4E airstrip, which all kinds of large aircraft can take off from and land safely on. Tianjin Binhai International Airport has 59 flight routes, connecting 48 cities, including 30 domestic cities and 17 foreign cities. Airline companies like Japan Airlines, All Nippon Airways, Korean Air, Asiana Airlines, Singapore Airlines Cargo and Martinair Holland all have flights to Tianjin Binhai International Airport.

Port of Tianjin

Tianjin port is the world's top-level and China's largest artificial deep water harbor, and the throughput capacity ranks fifth in the world. Located in Binhai Economic Zone, a national new economic zone of China, Tianjin harbor is the port of call of international cruises visiting the wider area, including Beijing.

Trams

Tianjin's harbor area of Binhai/TEDA has a modern, high speed rubber tired tram system, which is the first of its kind in China and Asia. Constructed in 2006, this marked a return of the tram to Tianjin, which once had an extensive standard steel-wheeled tramway network. The original Tianjin tram network was constructed by a Belgian company in 1904 and opened in 1906. It was the first citywide tramway system in China. It closed in 1972.

Metro

The Tianjin Metro is formerly operated by two companies, Tianjin Metro General Corporation and Tianjin Binhai Mass Transit Development Company. However, in 2017, the two companies merged as Tianjin Rail Transit Group Corporation. They are currently under heavy expansion from five to nine lines. Six lines are currently operating both in the City and the Binhai area. As of April 2019, the entire network of Tianjin Metro has 155 stations and 6 lines.

Construction work on the Tianjin Metro started on July 4, 1970. It was the second metro to be built in China and commenced service in 1984. The metro service was suspended on October 9, 2001 for reconstruction. The original line is now part of Line 1 of the new metro system. It was reopened to the public in June 2006. Construction work on Line 2 and Line 3 was completed in 2012 and the two lines are now in operation. Several new metro lines are planned.

The two rapid transit operators in Tianjin are responsible for the service as follows:
 Tianjin Metro General Corporation, operates Lines 1, 2, 3 and 6
 Tianjin Binhai Mass Transit Development Company, operates Lines 5 and 9

Rail

There are several railway stations in the city, Tianjin railway station being the principal one. It was built in 1888. The station was initially located at Wangdaozhuang. The station was later moved to Laolongtou on the banks of the Hai He River in 1892, so the station was renamed Laolongtou Railway Station. The station was rebuilt from scratch in 1988. The rebuilding work began on April 15, 1987 and was finished on October 1, 1988. The Tianjin Railway Station is also locally called the 'East Station', due to its geographical position. In January 2007, the station began another long-term restructuring project to modernize the facility and as part of the larger Tianjin transport hub project involving Tianjin Metro lines 2, 3, and 9 as well as the Tianjin-Beijing High-speed rail.

Tianjin West railway station and Tianjin North railway station are also major railway stations in Tianjin. There is also Tanggu railway station is located in the important port area of Tanggu District, and Binhai railway station and Binhai North railway station located in TEDA, to the north of Tanggu. There are several other railway stations in the city that do not handle passenger traffic. Construction on a Beijing-Tianjin high-speed rail began on July 4, 2005 and was completed by August 2008.

The following rail lines go through Tianjin:
 Jingshan Railway, from Beijing to Shanhai Pass
 Jinpu Railway, from Tianjin to Pukou District, Nanjing
 Jinji Railway, from Tianjin urban area to Ji County, Tianjin
 Jinba Railway, from Tianjin to Bazhou, Hebei

The inter-city trains between Beijing and Tianjin will adopt a new numbering system: Cxxxx (C stands for interCity). The train numbers range between C2001～C2298:
 C2001～C2198: From Beijing South Station to Tianjin, directly
 C2201～C2268: From Beijing South Station to Tianjin, with stops at Wuqing Station (武清站)
 C2271～C2298: From Beijing South Station to Yujiapu Railway Station of Tianjin

The new C trains take only 30 min to travel between Beijing and Tianjin, cutting the previous D train time by more than a half. The ticket price as of Aug 15, 08 is 69 RMB for the first-class seat and 58 RMB for the second-class seat.

Bus

There were over 900 bus lines in the city .

Roads and expressways
Some roads and bridges have retained names that hark back to the Republic of China era (1912–1949) such as Minquan Gate and Beiyang Road. Like with most cities in China, many roads in Tianjin are named after Chinese provinces and cities. Also, Tianjin is unlike Beijing, in that very few roads run parallel to the major four cardinal directions.

Tianjin has three ring roads. The Inner and Middle Ring Roads are not closed, traffic-controlled roadways and some often have traffic light intersections. The Outer Ring Road is the closest thing to a highway-level ring road, although traffic is often chaotic.
 Inner Ring Road (neihuan)
 Middle Ring Road (zhonghuan)
 Outer Ring Road (waihuan)

Tianjin's roads often finish in dao, xian. These are most often used for highways and through routes. The terms lu. Jie are rare. As Tianjin's roads are rarely in a cardinal compass direction, jing roads and wei roads often appear, which attempt to run more directly north–south and east–west, respectively.

The following seven expressways of China run in or through Tianjin:
 Jingjintang Expressway, from Beijing, through Tianjin's urban area, to Tanggu District / TEDA
 Jinghu Expressway, from Jinjing Gonglu Bridge to Shanghai (together with Jingjintang Expressway, this is the expressway from Beijing to Shanghai)
 Jingshen Expressway, through Baodi District on its way from Beijing to Shenyang
 Tangjin Expressway, from Tanggu District, Tianjin, to Tangshan, Hebei—known in Tianjin as the Jintang Expressway
 Baojin Expressway, from Beichen District, Tianjin, to Baoding, Hebei—known in Tianjin as the Jinbao Expressway
 Jinbin Expressway, from Zhangguizhuang Bridge to Hujiayuan Bridge, both within Tianjin
 Jinji Expressway, from central Tianjin to Jixian County

The following six China National Highways pass through Tianjin:
 China National Highway 102, through Ji County, Tianjin on its way from Beijing to Harbin
 China National Highway 103, from Beijing, through Tianjin's urban area, to Tanggu District
 China National Highway 104, from Beijing, through Tianjin Municipality, to Fuzhou
 China National Highway 105, from Beijing, through Tianjin Municipality, to Macau
 China National Highway 112, circular highway around Beijing, passes through Tianjin Municipality
 China National Highway 205, from Shanhaiguan, Hebei, through Tianjin Municipality, to Guangzhou

Religion
Residents of Tianjin participate in indigenous religious practices, such as the veneration of the Goddess of Sea, Mazu. In addition, Tianjin has a Buddhist Temple of Great Compassion, a Catholic St. Joseph's Cathedral (Laoxikai Church), a Catholic Our Lady of Victory Church (Wanghailou Church). A Roman Catholic Diocese of Tianjin exists. According to the Chinese General Social Survey of 2009, Christians constitute 1.51% of the city's population. Tianjin has been described as a historically "strong center" of Islam in China. Northwestern Tianjin is traditionally the location of the Muslim quarter of the city, where they have lived for centuries near the city's huge Great Mosque, Qingzhen si, founded in 1703. Other mosques include the Dahuoxiang Mosque.

Sports
Sports teams based in Tianjin include:

Chinese Super League
 Tianjin Jinmen Tiger
China Baseball League
 Tianjin Lions
Chinese Basketball Association
 Tianjin Pioneers
Chinese Volleyball League
 Tianjin Bohai Bank women's volleyball team

The 1995 World Table Tennis Championships, the 2013 East Asian Games, and the 2017 National Games of China were hosted by the city. Additionally, Tianjin will be one of the host cities for the expanded FIFA Club World Cup (postponed from 2021). It was also scheduled to be one of the host cities for the 2023 AFC Asian Cup before China's withdrawal as the host.

Since 2014, a WTA international tennis tournament has taken place in Tianjin every year at the Tuanbo International Tennis Center.

Martial arts
Together with Beijing, Tianjin had been for many centuries considered a center for traditional Chinese martial arts. Many past and present masters of arts such as Bajiquan, Pigua Zhang, Xing Yi Quan, Bagua Zhang and others lived or are living in the city. The districts most famous for martial arts in the city are Hong Qiao and Nankai, and martial artists abound in public green spaces such as Xigu Park and the Tianjin Water Park.

Education

Colleges and universities 

Under the national Ministry of Education:
 Tianjin University (founded 1895, the first modern university in China)
 Nankai University (founded 1919, one of the most prestigious universities in China)
Under the municipal government:
 Tianjin Academy of Fine Arts
 Tianjin Agricultural College
 Tianjin Chengjian University
 Tianjin Conservatory of Music
 Tianjin Foreign Studies University
 Tianjin Institute of Physical Education
 Tianjin Medical University
 Tianjin Normal University
 Tianjin Polytechnic University
 Tianjin University of Commerce
 Tianjin University of Finance & Economics
 Tianjin University of Science & Technology
 Tianjin University of Technology
 Tianjin University of Technology and Education
 Tianjin University of Traditional Chinese Medicine

Under the national Civil Aviation Authority of China:
 Civil Aviation University of China

Under the Hebei Provincial People's Government:
 Hebei University of Technology (founded 1903, the earliest institute of technology in China)

Foreign institutions:
 The Florida International University Tianjin Center, opened in 2006 as a cooperative venture between the municipal government and the Miami-based university.
 The Great Wall MBA Program Oklahoma City University Meinders School of Business, established in 1986 on the campus of Tianjin University of Finance & Economics.
 Raffles Design Institute Tianjin is a joint-project between Tianjin University of Commerce, Boustead College and Raffles Design Institute, Singapore.

Private:
 Boustead College

Note: Institutions without full-time bachelor programs are not listed.

High schools 

 Tianjin Nankai High School
 Tianjin No.1 High School
 Tianjin Yaohua Middle School was founded in 1927. It was previously named as Tianjin Gongxue by Mr. Lefeng Zhuang, and was renamed as Tianjin Yaohua Middle school in 1934. 
 Tianjin Xinhua High School
 Tianjin Experimental High School
 Tianjin No.21 High School: Tianjin No. 21 High School, formerly Fahan College, was founded in 1895. The French ambassador to China and consul general in Tianjin  called it the French academy, with the purpose of training Chinese in French talent; it was then renamed "" in 1902 before moving to its current address in 1916, when it was then renamed Fahan College; the French name is still "EcoleMunicipaleFrancaise". The school is located in the center of the political and cultural education in Heping district, adjacent to the largest Catholic church in northern China, thus the main building of the school has retained its church appearance The school covers an area of 10.1 mu (6.7 km2), while the building floor area is 10,300 square meters.
 Tianjin Tianjin High School
 Tianjin Fuxing High School
 Tianjin Ruijing High School
 The Foreign Languages School Affiliated to Tianjin Foreign Studies University (TFLS)
 Tianjin No.20 High School
 Tianjin No.4 High School
 Tianjin Yangcun No.1 High School
 Tianjin Ji No.1 High School
 Tianjin Dagang No.1 High School
 Tianjin Second Nankai High School
 Tianjin Tanggu No.1 High School
 Tianjin No.42 High School
 Tianjin Baodi No.1 High School
 Tianjin Dagang Oilfield Experimental High School
 Tianjin No.47 High School
 Tianjin No.7 High School
 Tianjin Jinghai No.1 High School
 Tianjin Haihe High School
 Tianjin Economic-Technological Development Area No. 1 High School
 Tianjin No.55 High School
 Tianjin High School Affiliated to Beijing Normal University
 Tianjin No.21 High School
 Tianjin Xianshuigu No.1 High School
 The High School Affiliated to Nankai University
 Tianjin No.41 High School
 Tianjin Lutai No.1 High School
 Tianjin No.2 High School
 Tianjin No.3 High School
 Tianjin Huiwen High School
 Tianjin Chonghua High School
 Tianjin No.100 High School
 Tianjin Hangu No.1 High School
 Tianjin Ziyun High School
 Tianjin No.102 High School
 Tianjin No.45 High School
 Tianjin No.25 High School
 The High School Affiliated to Tianjin University
 Tianjin No.5 High School
 Tianjin Yangliuqing No. 1 High School
 Tianjin No.14 High School
 Tianjin National High School
 Tianjin No.54 High School
 Tianjin No.43 High School
 Tianjin Ironworks No.2 High School
 Tianjin No.9 High School
 Tianjin No.57 High School
 Tianjin No.51 High School
 Tianjin Fulun High School
 Tianjin Bohai Petroleum No.1 High School

Middle schools

 Tianjin No. 7 Middle School

Notable people from Tianjin

Robert Ya Fu Lee (1913 –1986), actor
Hou Baolin (19171993), Popular xiangsheng performer
Xia Baolong (1952), Chinese Politician and a member of National People's Congress Environment Protection and Resources Conservation Committee..
Wang Hao (1992), World champion diver
Liu Huan (1963), Popular modern singer and songwriter, professor of western music at the Beijing University of International Business and Economics
Wen Jiabao (1942), former premier of China 20032013
Harry Kingman (18921982), the only major league baseball player born in China
Eric Liddell (19021945), Olympic gold medalist
Gao Lingwei (18701940), Former premier of the Republic of China 1923-1924
Gao Lingwen (1862–1945), founder of Tianjin's first public school
Adeline Yen Mah (1937), Chinese-born American author of Falling Leaves and Chinese Cinderella: The Secret Story of an Unwanted Daughter
Zhang Meng (1988), Actress
Zhang Pengxiang (1980), Chess Grandmaster
Liu Ping (1984), Paralympic gold medalist sprinter
Chang Po-ling (18761951), Founder of Nankai University
Qin Gang (1966), former Chinese Ambassador to the United States and current Chinese foreign minister
Wang Qiang (1992), Chinese professional female tennis player
Zhou Ruchang (19182012), Renowned Chinese Redologist and calligrapher
Shao Fang Sheng (1917–2009) Chinese artist
Peng Shuai (1986), Chinese professional female tennis player
Zhang Shuai (1989), Chinese professional female tennis player
Lubert Stryer (1938), American professor of biochemistry
Zhang Boli (1948), Traditional Chinese medicine practitioner
Lam Suet (1964), actor from Hong Kong
Fung Wang-yuen (Wu Ma) (19422014), Actor, director, producer, and writer of movies
Tan Xue (1984), Olympic and world champion fencer
Zhao Yanming (1981), Professional football goalkeeper
Sun Yaoting (19021992), Last surviving imperial eunuch from China
Shang Yi (1979), Professional football midfielder; sports commentator
Chen Yibing (1984), World champion and Olympic gold medal gymnast
Hao Jingfang (1987), science-fiction writer
Xu Yifan (1988), Professional tennis player
Yang Yi (1919–2023), translator of Wuthering Heights into Chinese
Yu Min (19262019), nuclear physicist and referred to as “the father of Chinese Hydrogen Bomb”
Yu Ying-shih (1930), Master historian and Sinologist
Duan Yingying (1989), Chinese professional female tennis player
Ed (Tse-chun) Young (1931), Award-winning Chinese-American children's book writer and illustrator
Huo Yuanjia (18681910), Famous Chinese martial artist; co-founder of the Chin Woo Athletic Association
Zhang Yuxuan (1994), Professional female tennis player
An Zhongxin (1971), Olympic silver medalist softball

Twin towns and sister cities 

  Kobe, Japan
  Chiba, Japan
  Incheon, South Korea
  Mobile, Alabama, United States
  Fitchburg, Massachusetts, United States
  Philadelphia, United States
  Melbourne, Australia
  Bangkok, Thailand
  Phnom Penh, Cambodia
  Pyongyang, North Korea
  Sarajevo, Bosnia and Herzegovina
 Abidjan, Côte d'Ivoire
  Groningen, the Netherlands (since 1985)
  Rishon LeZion, Israel
  İzmir, Turkey
  Haiphong, Vietnam (since 1997)
 
  Mar del Plata, Argentina (since 2001)
  Larnaca, Republic of Cyprus (since 2007)
  Jönköping, Sweden (since 1993)
  Thessaloniki, Greece (since 2002)
  Cali, Colombia (since 2022)

See also 

 Tianjin is also the name of an asterism in the Chinese constellation of Girl Mansion.

Notes

References

Citations

Sources 

 Miscellaneous series, Issues 7–11. United States Department of Commerce, Bureau of Foreign and Domestic Commerce, 1912.
 Walravens, Hartmut. "German Influence on the Press in China". – In: Newspapers in International Librarianship: Papers Presented by the Newspaper Section at IFLA General Conferences. Walter de Gruyter, January 1, 2003. , .
 Also available at (Archive) the website of the Queens Library – This version does not include the footnotes visible in the Walter de Gruyter version
 Also available in Walravens, Hartmut and Edmund King. Newspapers in international librarianship: papers presented by the newspapers section at IFLA General Conferences. K.G. Saur, 2003. , 9783598218378.

Further reading
 (fr) Mathieu Gotteland, Les forces de l'ordre japonaises à Tientsin, 1914–1940 : Un point de vue français, Éditions universitaires européennes, 2015.
 
 
 Maurizio Marinelli, Giovanni Andornino, Italy's Encounter with Modern China: Imperial dreams, strategic ambitions, New York: Palgrave Macmillan, 2014.
 Maurizio Marinelli, "The Triumph of the Uncanny: Italians and Italian Architecture in Tianjin", In Cultural Studies Review, Vol. 19, 2, 2013, 70–98.
 Maurizio Marinelli, "The Genesis of the Italian Concession in Tianjin: A Combination of Wishful Thinking and Realpolitik". Journal of Modern Italian Studies, 15 (4), 2010: 536–556.

External links 

 Tianjin Government website
China (Tianjin) Pilot Free Trade Zone 
 Economic profile for Tianjin at HKTDC
 Official Tianjin Media Gateway 
 Historic US Army map of Tianjin, 1945
 Official promotional video of Tianjin City
 

 
Municipalities of China
Metropolitan areas of China
North China Plain
Populated coastal places in China
Province-level divisions of China
Populated places with period of establishment missing